Thomas James Longley (born 22 April 1989) is an English actor and model.

Career
In 2004, Longley achieved acclaim from The Times for his performance as Gabriel in a widely publicised revival of The Mystery Plays at Canterbury Cathedral. He has since appeared in the indie films Sparrow (2010), Day and Night (2012), and Island (2013). In 2011, he briefly modelled for Reiss. On 22 August 2018 he released a single, "She's Dynamite".

References

External links 

Living people
English male film actors
English male stage actors
National Youth Theatre members
People from Canterbury
1989 births
Male actors from Kent